Daniel Doyle (28 April 1940 – 6 August 2019) was an Irish folk singer born in Dublin. During the 1960s and 1970s, he was one of the top Irish singers, regularly featuring in the Irish charts and scoring three No.1 singles. He recorded 25 albums and is known for his chart-topping songs "Whiskey on a Sunday", "A Daisy a Day", and "The Rare Auld Times".

Biography
He was born in Dublin. After leaving school at the age of fourteen, Doyle started doing odd jobs, including working as general factotum in Dublin's Pike Theatre, where he began to pick up, from the travelling players, songs from the Irish countryside.

During the 1960s and 1970s, he was one of the top Irish singers, regularly featuring in the Irish charts and scoring three No.1 singles. His song "The Rare Auld Times" notably displaced ABBA's "Take a Chance on Me" after just one week at the top. The song was composed in the 1970s by Pete St. John for the Dublin City Ramblers and peaked on the Irish Music Charts for 12 weeks. In 1979 Doyle was the first artist to record St John's song "The Fields of Athenry". He is probably best known for his 1967 number one hit "Whiskey on a Sunday". His other notable works are "A Daisy a Day" and "The Rare Auld Times". The hit songs "A Daisy A Day", "Streets Of London", "Lizzie Lindsay" and "Whiskey On A Sunday" that were released in the 1960s made him popular.

In 1983 he moved to the United States from Ireland.

He appeared in concert throughout the world, including Carnegie Hall, New York and the Albert Hall, London. He also collaborated with Bill Whelan who was a pianist, producer and Riverdance composer.

Although retired from performing, he performed with other artists at the 2010 Milwaukee Irish Fest.

Doyle died on 6 August 2019 at the age of 79 at his residence in the United States. He is survived by his wife Taffy.

Discography

Albums
 The Gatecrashers (1967)
 Expressions of Danny Doyle (1967)		
 A Portrait of Danny Doyle (1969)		
 The Hits of Danny Doyle
 Danny Doyle (LP)		
 Danny Doyle Vol:2 (1975)
 A Very Special Love Song
 Born a Ramblin' Man (1976)	
 Whiskey on a Sunday (1976)
 The West's Awake(1976)
 Harry Nilsson's the Point (1977)
 Presenting Danny Doyle (1977)
 Grand Old Irish Opry (1978)
 Raised on Songs and Stories (1980)
 The Highwayman (1981)
 Twenty Years A-Growing (1987)
 Dublin Me Darlin (1990)
 Folk Masters Ensemble (1994)		
 Under a Connemara Moon (1995)
 Spirit of the Gael (2002)
 Emigrant Eyes
 Step It Out
 Classic Collection
 St. Brendan's Fair Isle
 The Wearing of the Green

Selected singles
 "Step It Out Mary" / "Pretty Saro" (IE #4) December, 1966
 "Irish Soldier Laddie" / "Morning Train" (IE #7) April, 1967
 "Step It Out Mary" / "Sam Hall" / "Early Morning Rain" / 2Red Haired Mary" EP, May 1967
 "Whiskey on a Sunday" / "Reason To Believe" (IE #1) September 1967
 "The Mucky Kid" / "Gone Away" (IE #17) March, 1968
 "Johnny" / "Leaving on a Jet Plane" October, 1968
 "The Long and Winding Road" June 1970
 "Take Me Home Country Roads" August 1971
 "The Green Hills of Kerry"
 "A Daisy a Day" / "Far Away in Australia" (IE #1) May, 1973
 "Thanks for the Memories" / "Kentucky Moonshine" (IE #2) January, 1974
 "A Very Special Love Song" / "Morning Bells Will Chime" (IE #11) July, 1974 
 "Jesus Is My Kind of People" / "Penny Annie" February, 1975 
 "Somewhere, Somebody's Waits" (IE #5) September, 1976
 "The Rare Auld Times" (IE #1) January, 1978
 "Old Dublin Town" / "Bells of the Morning" 1978 
 "The Rare Auld Times" / "Old Dublin Town" (re-release) (IE #14) 1979

Books
 The Gold Sun of Freedom (with Terence Folan)

References

External links
Danny Doyle Home Page

1940 births
2019 deaths
20th-century Irish male singers
Irish emigrants to the United States
Irish folk singers
Singers from Dublin (city)